Oukoop is a hamlet in the Dutch province of South Holland. It is a part of the former municipality of Reeuwijk, and lies about 4 km east of Gouda.

The statistical area "Oukoop", which also can include the surrounding countryside, has a population of around 60.

Oukoop was a separate municipality between 1818 and 1857, when it merged with Hekendorp.

References

Bodegraven-Reeuwijk
Populated places in South Holland
Former municipalities of South Holland
1818 establishments in the Netherlands